The Ysidro Formation is a geologic formation in Baja California state, northwestern Mexico.

It preserves fossils dating back to the Miocene epoch of the Neogene period.

See also 
 
 List of fossiliferous stratigraphic units in Mexico

External links 
 

Neogene Mexico
Geography of Baja California
Geologic formations of Mexico
Natural history of Baja California
Miocene Series of North America